Flavonifractor plautii is a bacterium of the monotypic genus Flavonifractor in the family Oscillospiraceae.

References

Taxa described in 2010

Bacteria described in 1928
Oscillospiraceae